Lugoff-Elgin High School (often LEHS)  is a public high school located in Lugoff, South Carolina. It is one of the three high schools in the Kershaw County School District of South Carolina. It opened in 1971. It is home of the Lugoff-Elgin Demons.

As of the 2014–15 school year, the school had an enrollment of 1,629 students and 83.5 classroom teachers (on an FTE basis), for a student–teacher ratio of 19.5:1. There were 514 students (31.6% of enrollment) eligible for free lunch and 80 (4.9% of students) eligible for reduced-cost lunch.

Athletics 
Football, baseball, wrestling, basketball, cheerleading, soccer, tennis, volleyball, archery, track and other sports are offered at LEHS.

South Carolina State Championship Titles:

Cheerleading: 1998, 1999

Baseball: 1992, 1993, 2010

Wrestling: 1997, 1998, 1999, 2001, 2003, 2010

Marching Band: 1981

Softball: 2021

National Champion Award 
Wrestling: Ben Connell – 2000

Big Head Champion
James Leroy Dent - 1996

Rivalry 
Camden and Lugoff-Elgin are rivals in every sport. This is referred around the Camden and Lugoff-Elgin area as the "Wateree River Rivalry".  The first football game against them was in 1978. Camden won the game with the score 19–6. They have been playing every year since 1982 (except 2020). The longest losing streak against Camden was from 1982 to 1995. Lugoff-Elgin's first win over Camden was in 1996 with the score 35–17. Camden won the last meeting in 2022 with the score 53–7. The 2020 game was canceled due to the COVID-19 Pandemic. Camden leads the rivalry 34–8.

References

External links/References 
 Lugoff-Elgin High School Homepage
 Kershaw County School District Homepage
 Kershaw County Website

See also 
 Kershaw County, South Carolina

Public high schools in South Carolina
Schools in Kershaw County, South Carolina
Educational institutions established in 1971
1971 establishments in South Carolina